The EF9345 from SGS-Thomson Microelectronics, Inc., was a semigraphic  microprocessor for video image control, encapsulated in a 40-pin DIP and used primarily in the Matra Alice 32, Matra Alice 90 and Philips VG5000 microcomputers.

The EF9345 was capable of displaying 8 colors (RGB primaries), 128 alphanumeric characters and 128 semigraphic characters. It had one semigraphic mode and 40- and 80-column text modes. It was able to address up to 16KB of dedicated video RAM.

Video Modes
50/60Hz output
 Interlaced or progressive scan
Semigraphics:
 128 standard character set with 5x7 pixel font dimensions. User definable 8x10 pixel alphanumeric or semigraphic sets.
40 characters x 25 rows text mode (similar to teletext):
 8 x 10 pixel font
 Selectable background and foreground colors
 Styles: double height, double width, blinking, reverse, underline, conceal, insert, accentuation of lowercase characters
80 characters x 25 rows text mode:
 6 x 10 pixel font
 Styles: blinking, underlining, reverse, color
 8 colors (3-bit RGB palette):

On-Chip Character Generator
The on-chip character generator offered several character sets, including alphanumeric and videotext compatible semigraphics.

See also
 Thomson EF936x
 Motorola 6847
 Motorola 6845
 TMS9918
 MOS Technology VIC-II
 List of home computers by video hardware

References

External links
 EF9345 datasheet

Graphics chips
Character sets